GS50 is a map projection that was developed by John Parr Snyder of the USGS in 1982. 

The GS50 projection provides a conformal projection suitable only for maps of the 50 United States. Scale varies less than 2% throughout the area covered. Distortion is very low as well. It is not a standard projection in the sense that it uses complex polynomials (of the tenth order) rather than a trigonometric formulation, though it was developed from an oblique stereographic projection.

References
 
 

Map projections
Conformal projections